Universidad Mariano Gálvez de Guatemala (UMG) is a private university in Zone 2 of Guatemala City.

References

External links
Official site 

Universities in Guatemala City